Narahi is a हिन्दू नगर and Village Development Committee करैयामाई गाऊपालिका-8  in Bara District  in the Narayani Zone of south-eastern Nepal. At the time of the 1991 Nepal census it had a population of 3,299 persons living in 572 individual households.https://sunilkalwar.business.site/

References

External links
UN map of the municipalities of Bara District

Populated places in Bara District